Rowdy Ramudu Konte Krishnudu is a 1980 Indian Telugu-language action film produced by N. T. Rama Rao under his Ramakrishna Cine Studios banner and directed by K. Raghavendra Rao. It stars N. T. Rama Rao, Nandamuri Balakrishna and Sridevi. The music composed by Chakravarthy.

Plot
Bhaji Prasad is a dreadful gangster who maintains an honorable facade. His acolyte Giri is malicious and always attempts to double-cross him. Both of them maintain two double agents, twin brothers Satyam & Narayana. Besides, Ramu valiant incline any risk for money. Once, he gets acquainted with a petty thief Mutyam and falls for her. Meanwhile, a young charming Krishna who works as a clerk in a bank lives with his mother and loves Bhaji Prasad's niece Lakshmi. Later, Ramu & Krishna twice meet in crazy situations and become good friends. Meanwhile, Bhaji Prasad gets disclosure an ancient treasure secluded in the Himalayas and also that an archaeologist Haragopal aimed its route map. Upon it, Giri too gains the key and plots. Just before they hit Haragopal, he safeguards the map in a locker of Krishna's bank. At the same time, Bhaji Prasad learns about the love affair of Krishna & Lakshmi. So, he bids Krishna for the cover when he refuses, Bhaji Prasad endangers his mother, and as helpless, he heists the map. Simultaneously, Giri also plans an attack, nevertheless, Krishna absconds and shields the map from his friend Ranga. Spotting it, the blackguards slaughters Ranga, but are unable to identify the map. Right now, Krishna is indicted for the crime and sentenced. Yet, Bhaji Prasad wants to win him back, so, he empowers the task to Ramu. Thereupon, Ramu feels something dubious, however, he relieves Krishna and hides him secretly. Afterward, they are enlightened as to their brothers through their mother who has been separated long back because of a mishap. Eventually, they acquire the map, realizing, that Bhaji Prasad reverts it, by imperiling Lakshmi. At present, the swindlers start their journey, when as a flabbergast, Satyam & Narayana appear as a single entity Satyanarayana, a person that falsified for his expediency. Before long, Ramu & Krishna chase them in disguise as guides. After making an adventurous tour they find the treasure. At last, Ramu & Krishna stop the baddies and hand over the treasure to the government. Finally, the movie ends on a happy note with the marriages of Ramu & Mutyam and Krishna & Lakshmi.

Cast

N. T. Rama Rao as Ramu
Nandamuri Balakrishna as Balakrishna
Sridevi as Mutyalu
Rajyalakshmi as Lakshmi
Rao Gopal Rao as Bhaji Prasad
Satyanarayana as Satyanayana
Jaggayya as I.G.
Kanta Rao as Hero's father
Mukkamala as Baba
Nutan Prasad as Giri
Raavi Kondala Rao as Jailor
Chalapathi Rao as Hargopal
Prasad Babu as Madhav
Lakshmi Kanth as Ranga
Sarathi
Chitti Babu
Chidatala Appa Rao as Kotigadu
Potti Prasad
Jagga Rao
Jayasudha as special appearance
Latha as Special appearance
Pushpalatha as Heroes mother
Jayamalini as item number

Soundtrack

Music composed by Chakravarthy. Lyrics written by Veturi.

Reception
On 22 August 1980, Griddaluru Gopalrao of Zamin Ryot criticised director Raghavendra Rao for making a "shoddy film". Sridhara of Sitara in his review dated 31 August 1980 gave a more mixed review for the film.

References

External links

1980 action films
1980s action drama films
1980s Telugu-language films
Films directed by K. Raghavendra Rao
Films scored by K. Chakravarthy
Indian action drama films